Nepal participated in the 2016 South Asian Games in Guwahati and Shillong, India from 5 February to 16 February 2016. First Gold Medal for Nepal was given by Wushu player Nima Gharti Magar. Similarly, Judo Player Fupu Lahmu Khatri give second success for Nepal winning  Gold medal in Judo. Later, Nepal won Men's Football Gold Medal.

Medal summary

Medal table
Nepal won 3 gold and a total of 61 medals.

References

Nations at the 2016 South Asian Games